Taumarere is a locality in the Bay of Islands in Northland, New Zealand. The Kawakawa River and State Highway 11 run through Taumarere. The town of Kawakawa is 3 km to the southwest. Opua is 7 km to the north and Paihia 14 km.

History
Taumarere was at the head of navigable tidal water on the Kawakawa River and a natural landing place, so a township developed here. It would likely have become the main town in the area, but after coal was discovered at Kawakawa in 1864, a new town developed there, becoming more important than Taumarere.

On 2 March 1868 a bush tramway line opened between Kawakawa and Taumarere wharf at what is now known as Derrick Landing to carry coal for export. It was built to the international  and motive power was provided by horses that hauled wagons along wooden rails. It was converted into a metal railway in 1870. In 1875, the government purchased the line and converted it to  gauge two years later. The line was extended to Opua in 1884 and called the Opua Branch. In 1925, it became part of the North Auckland Line. This line has since become a part of the Bay of Islands Vintage Railway, a tourist-oriented heritage railway.

St. Andrew's Church originally stood on the site of the Church Missionary Society's Paihia Mission Station.  In 1927 the building was transported by barge and bullock waggon to its present site.

Demographics
The statistical area of Matawaia-Taumarere surrounds but does not include the towns of Kawakawa and Moerewa.

Matawaia-Taumarere had a population of 1,374 at the 2018 New Zealand census, an increase of 228 people (19.9%) since the 2013 census, and an increase of 150 people (12.3%) since the 2006 census. There were 441 households, comprising 714 males and 663 females, giving a sex ratio of 1.08 males per female. The median age was 41.2 years (compared with 37.4 years nationally), with 330 people (24.0%) aged under 15 years, 222 (16.2%) aged 15 to 29, 609 (44.3%) aged 30 to 64, and 213 (15.5%) aged 65 or older.

Ethnicities were 48.5% European/Pākehā, 65.1% Māori, 4.6% Pacific peoples, 1.3% Asian, and 1.1% other ethnicities. People may identify with more than one ethnicity.

The percentage of people born overseas was 10.3, compared with 27.1% nationally.

Although some people chose not to answer the census's question about religious affiliation, 45.2% had no religion, 40.2% were Christian, 4.6% had Māori religious beliefs, 0.2% were Buddhist and 1.5% had other religions.

Of those at least 15 years old, 117 (11.2%) people had a bachelor's or higher degree, and 252 (24.1%) people had no formal qualifications. The median income was $22,900, compared with $31,800 nationally. 78 people (7.5%) earned over $70,000 compared to 17.2% nationally. The employment status of those at least 15 was that 471 (45.1%) people were employed full-time, 153 (14.7%) were part-time, and 66 (6.3%) were unemployed.

Notes

Far North District
Populated places in the Northland Region
Bay of Islands